"Walkin' on the Sun" is a song by American rock band Smash Mouth from their first album, Fush Yu Mang (1997). Released as their debut single in June 1997, the song was Smash Mouth's first major single, reaching  1 on the US Billboard Modern Rock Tracks chart and No. 2 on the Billboard Hot 100 Airplay chart. It was also a success abroad, peaking at No. 3 in Canada and Iceland, No. 5 in Italy and Spain, and No. 7 in Australia, where it is certified platinum for shipments exceeding 70,000.

Background
Smash Mouth guitarist Greg Camp said about "Walkin' on the Sun": 

Paul De Lisle stated the original version of "Walkin' on the Sun" was more of a rap song.

The band decided to record the song after band drummer Kevin Coleman discovered it on one of Camp's tapes. It was the last song to be added onto Fush Yu Mang.

The guitar melody present throughout the song has been compared to the keyboard riff from "Swan Splashdown" by Perrey & Kingsley, from the album The In Sound from Way Out.

Critical reception
Pan-European magazine Music & Media described it as a "punchy and highly infectious track." They noted that it "deftly fuses punk and ska—and that's a feat which it manages while avoiding sounding stereotypical of either genre." Music Week rated the song five out of five, adding, "This fun-loving US quartet have managed to fuse The Doors with the Stereo MCs to create a deliciously frug-inducing slice of slacker pop. A cracker." A reviewer from NME wrote, "'Walkin' On The Sun' is a classic, straight out of the groovy, secret agent world of Austin Powers. Although it was written in the aftermath of the Rodney King beatings, it has an organ hook that's a deadringer for The Zombies' 'She's Not There' and growling staccato vocal that make it the perfect soundtrack for a strut down Carnaby Street circa 1967." Ian Hyland from Sunday Mirror gave the song nine out of ten. He commented, "It's jingly jangly American guitar music and Radio One are playing it to death. It'll be massive, then they'll disappear."

Music video

The accompanying music video for the song begins with each band member, one at a time, walking down a dark alley. Then, the band performs in a room while scenes of Harwell pushing a remote control makes two girls appear in a chamber. Afterwards, the band performs on a beach while beachgoers dance around them. The scene then changes to the band performing in front of the two same girls in an area full of flashing bright lights. A drag race is then shown in the street where a yellow hot rod races against an orange hot rod which the band is in. However, in the middle of the race, the orange hot rod crashes, and the race attendees and female race judge rush over to the scene. The band still performs while lying on the ground despite the crash. The video ends with them leaning close to the camera.

Track listings

Charts and certifications

Weekly charts
"Walkin' on the Sun"

"Walkin' on the Sun 2017"

Year-end charts

Certifications

Release history

Use in media
The song is a playable track in the video game Rock Band 3 and was featured in the movies An American Werewolf in Paris (1997) and Can't Hardly Wait (1998), and the television film Shredderman Rules (2007). It was also featured in early television advertisments to promote the Fox series Firefly in 2002. The television series ER featured the song during the opening scene of Season 4 Episode 13 "Carter's Choice", when Dr. Carter was arriving at work in the snow.

The song is included in "Weird Al" Yankovic's medley "Polka Power!" from his 1999 album Running With Scissors. Neil Cicierega sampled the song in "Daft Mouth" off his album Mouth Sounds.

See also
 List of RPM Rock/Alternative number-one singles (Canada)
 Number one modern rock hits of 1997

References

1997 debut singles
1997 songs
Interscope Records albums
Music videos directed by McG
Pop rock songs
Protest songs
Psychedelic soul songs
Song recordings produced by Eric Valentine
Songs written by Greg Camp
Smash Mouth songs
Songs about climate change
Environmental songs